Events from the year 1875 in Michigan.

Office holders

State office holders
 Governor of Michigan: John J. Bagley (Republican)
 Lieutenant Governor of Michigan: Henry H. Holt (Republican)
 Michigan Attorney General: Isaac Marston/Andrew J. Smith
 Michigan Secretary of State: Daniel Striker/Ebenezer G. D. Holden
 Speaker of the Michigan House of Representatives: John Philo Hoyt (Republican)
 Chief Justice, Michigan Supreme Court: Benjamin F. Graves

Mayors of major cities

 Mayor of Detroit: Hugh Moffat (Republican) 
 Mayor of Grand Rapids: Peter R. L. Peirce
 Mayor of Saginaw: Chauncey W. Wisner

Federal office holders

 U.S. Senator from Michigan: Zachariah Chandler (Republican)/Isaac P. Christiancy
 U.S. Senator from Michigan: Thomas W. Ferry (Republican) 
 House District 1: Alpheus S. Williams (Democrat)
 House District 2: Henry Waldron (Republican)
 House District 3: George Willard (Republican)
 House District 4: Julius C. Burrows (Republican)/Allen Potter
 House District 5: William B. Williams (Republican)
 House District 6: Josiah Begole/George H. Durand (Democrat)
 House District 7: Omar D. Conger (Republican)
 House District 8: Nathan B. Bradley (Republican)
 House District 9: Jay Abel Hubbell (Republican)

Population

Sports

Baseball 
 1875 Michigan Wolverines baseball season - The Wolverines compiled a 1–2 record, winning a game against the Detroit Aetnas and losing games to the Aetnas and Jackson Mutuals. William Johnson was the team captain.

Chronology of events

January

February

April

May

June

July

August

November

December

Births

 January 31 – Horace B. Carpenter, silent movie actor, director, and screenwriter, in Grand Rapids, Michigan
 February 22 – James Kirkwood Sr., silent movie actor and director, in Grand Rapids
 December 2 – Louis C. Cramton, U.S. Representative from Michigan's 7th District (1913-1931), at Hadley Township, Michigan

Deaths
 March 18 – George G. B. Yeckley, member of the Michigan House of Representatives, died in office, at 44, in Hamilton Township, Van Buren County
 May 16 – Daniel Dunakin, member of the Michigan House of Representatives (1855–1856), at age 65

See also
 History of Michigan
 History of Detroit

References